George Sisler (1893–1973) was an American Major League Baseball player and member of the National Baseball Hall of Fame.

George Sisler may also refer to:

George Sisler Jr. (1917–2006), American minor league baseball general manager and president of the International League, son of the aforementioned George Sisler
George K. Sisler (1937–1967), United States Army officer, recipient of the Medal of Honor for his actions in the Vietnam War